Maury, originally titled The Maury Povich Show, is an American tabloid talk show hosted by Maury Povich that ran in first-run syndication from 1991 to 2022.

The series premiered in 1991 as The Maury Povich Show and was produced by MoPo Productions Inc. in association with Paramount Domestic Television. The show began unofficially using the title Maury in the 1995–1996 season, although its original title remained official until 1998, when Studios USA (now NBCUniversal) took over production and the show was officially retitled Maury. MoPo Productions Inc has continued to co-produce with NBCUniversal. For the series' first 18 seasons, it was taped in New York City; from 2009 until its end in 2022, the show was taped at the Rich Forum in Stamford, Connecticut, which is alternately known as the Stamford Media Center, along with NBC's other syndicated programming. 

With a run spanning 31 seasons, Maury is the longest-running daytime talk show with a single host in American history.

Common show themes
Maury has dealt with a variety of issues across its 31 seasons, including—but not limited to—teenage pregnancy, sexual infidelity, paternity test results, uncommon illnesses, makeovers, "out of control" teenagers, transgender individuals, sperm theft, obese children, domestic violence, little people, bullying, and unusual phobias. After the taping of these episodes, guests are often tracked for progress, both on air and on the Maury website.

Episodes featuring updates on past guests are periodically aired throughout the year. Guests either appear in person or by video message updating Maury on their situations. At the end of every season, Maury does a countdown of the top 10 most memorable guests of the year, with updates on each guest.

Povich, whose background prior to launching Maury was in major-market local news and tabloid journalism, treated each episode and story with the seriousness of a journalist, noting that despite the show's theatrics and entertainment elements, each story he covered involved real people and real-life consequences. He was especially proud of cases where men would own up to their paternity, get involved in their child's life, and reunite with the mother to form a stable nuclear family. Much of Povich's focus on paternity tests came from his steadfast belief in the virtues of the nuclear family and his stance that children were best served with both parents involved in the child's life.

Broadcast history
For the first 18 seasons, Maury episodes were taped back-to-back at the Grand Ballroom of the Hotel Pennsylvania in New York City. The studio shared the facility in the Hotel Pennsylvania with The People's Court until the show relocated studios in 1998, and The Sally Jessy Raphael Show until its cancellation in 2002.

As of 2007, NBC-owned and operated stations no longer air Maury.

For the 2009–10 season, production was moved from New York City to Stamford, Connecticut, where the series is now taped at the Stamford Media Center, along with Jerry Springer and The Steve Wilkos Show. This move was made in part because Connecticut offered NBC a tax credit if production of these three series was moved to the state. A large overhead crane is used to hoist the centerpiece backdrop during conversions for show filming. It takes about 3 hours and a crew of about 15 decorators and electricians to convert the studio set from one show to the other. When a guest runs backstage on Maury, it is not uncommon to see Steve Wilkos or Jerry Springer set props come into view.

On September 17, 2012, during the premiere of its 22nd season, episodes of Maury began airing in widescreen, though not in high definition. On September 15, 2014, starting with its 24th season, episodes of Maury started airing in high definition. In October 2014, Maury was renewed through September 2018. In June 2018, Maury was renewed again through the 2019–2020 television season.

In March 2020, Maury was renewed through the 2021–2022 season. In December 2021, it was reported that the show would end the following spring. In March 2022, Povich, then 83 years old, announced his retirement effective at the end of the 2021–22 season, with a conflict show hosted by Karamo Brown (who had guest-hosted several Maury episodes during its final season) being shopped by NBCUniversal to take over the time slot, while reruns of Maury will be made available to stations. In a June 2022 postmortem, Povich discussed his career with Greg Braxton of the Los Angeles Times, noting that he had accomplished all he had wanted to do during his career, was proud of what he had created with Maury (especially in maintaining the show's ratings in a time when daytime television audiences were shrinking rapidly), and had no further desire for any other television projects.

Content editing
The series is edited to meet FCC regulations for indecency and obscenity, including bleeping of profane language and pixelization of nudity, though other censoring does take place; the series purposefully has guests avoid using their last names, mainly for the protection of minors and outside third parties, and said mentions of last names by guests (except for the show's rotation of experts) are bleeped in line with this policy. Additionally, no "uncut" versions of the show exist, unlike with its rival/companion series Jerry Springer, which openly marketed uncensored content on home video.

Internship promoting and telemarketing

Two well publicized advertising methods on Maury relate to the hiring of interns as well as polling the television audience with the allure of "valuable offers".  The latter is also a promotional tactic used on the show Divorce Court.

The show is known for promoting an in-house "intern program", encouraging college students to apply for employment. In 2010, a United States Department of Education report indicated:

The talk show "Maury" is abusing government programs sponsored by the Department of Education.  This production is attempting to prove that there is an overwhelming demand for interns and has solicited applications from hundreds of different institutions of higher learning.  The interns are almost never hired; however, the production has applied under several clauses for government funding under claims that a large number of internships have been granted.

Maury, like several daytime programs, also has a phone-in survey segment, a feature which has drawn criticism from some as the survey also features third-party "valuable offers" which may offer the purchase of some kind of product, but also give an inroad to telemarketers around do not call lists, as the interaction technically counts as allowing those calls past do not call lists, and may place the number called from on 'do call' phone lists used by the telemarketing industry.

Awards
Maury has been nominated once, in 2017, for the Daytime Emmy Award for Outstanding Talk Show Entertainment, losing to The Ellen DeGeneres Show.

Criticism
Some critics denounce Maury as being worse than other similar talk shows, such as Jerry Springer. Like such shows, it uses guests' serious problems for the entertainment of the viewing audience, but treated with an insincere sympathy. Whitney Matheson wrote about the show in her USA Today column, "Povich's talk show is, without a doubt, the worst thing on television. Period. Don't be fooled by the pressed shirt and pleated khakis; Maury is miles farther down the commode than Jerry Springer."

Spin-off and inspiration
 On February 27, 2012, it was announced that Maury regular Trisha Goddard, who hosted her own talk show in her native England, would be coming to America with The Trisha Goddard Show, which was produced by Maury executive producer Paul Faulhaber and premiered in syndication in fall 2012. The show, considered a spin-off of Maury, was cancelled after two seasons.
 Though not a spin-off, it has been reported that the tabloid talk/court show Paternity Court, which premiered on September 23, 2013, was inspired by Maury.

See also

Talk show
Daytime television
Syndicated television
The Jerry Springer Show
Karamo
Face to Face, a Philippine talk show

References

External links
 Official website
 

1991 American television series debuts
2022 American television series endings
1990s American television talk shows
2000s American television talk shows
2010s American television talk shows
2020s American television talk shows
English-language television shows
First-run syndicated television programs in the United States
Television series by Universal Television
Culture of Stamford, Connecticut
Television shows filmed in Connecticut